State Route 92 (SR 92) is a state highway in East Tennessee with both four lane and two lane sections.

Route description
SR 92 begins at US 411/SR 35 in Chestnut Hill. It heads north toward Dandridge and crosses over the French Broad River/Douglas Lake just inside Dandridge city limits, just after crossing the river/lake it junctions with SR 139 in downtown. It the junctions with US 25W, US 70 and SR 66 in downtown Dandridge. SR 92 begins a  concurrency with US 25W, US 70 and SR 66, the four routes head west then northwest to where US 25W, US 70 and SR 66 head west and SR 92 heads northward and becomes a four-lane divided highway. Next it junctions with I-40 at exit 417. The two routes head west to where US 11E heads west and SR 92 turns northeast on the edge of Jefferson City. SR 92 then leaves Jefferson City and turns northwest. It then crosses the Holston River just west of Cherokee Dam on the Jefferson–Grainger county line heads north to end at US 11W in downtown Rutledge.

Since 1971, plans were proposed for SR 92 to be extended north of Rutledge to cross the Clinch Mountain ridgeline connecting to the unincorporated town of Washburn, but no action has been taken to move forward with these plans.

Junction list

References

092
Transportation in Grainger County, Tennessee
Transportation in Jefferson County, Tennessee